This is a list of Croatian television related events from 1968.

Events

Debuts

Television shows

Ending this year

Births
28 January - Duško Ćurlić, TV & radio host
10 May - Emilija Kokić, singer & TV host
7 July - Karmela Vukov-Colić, journalist & TV host

Deaths